Rowson is a surname. Notable people with the surname include:

David Rowson (born 1976), Scottish footballer
Guy Rowson (1883–1937), English politician
James Rowson (born 1976), American baseball player and coach
Jonathan Rowson (born 1977), Scottish chess grandmaster and writer
Leslie Rowson (1903–1977), English cinematographer
Martin Rowson (born 1959), English cartoonist and writer
Susanna Rowson (1762–1824), British-American writer, poet, and playwright